Zolbingiin Shijee (1901 – July 27, 1941) was a Mongolian revolutionary who served as secretary of the Mongolian People's Revolutionary Party (MPRP) from 1930 to 1932 and concurrently as First Secretary of the Central Committee of the MPRP from March 13, 1931 to June 30, 1932. Considered one of the more extreme leftists of the MPRP, he was expelled from the party in 1932 for his role in the "Leftist Deviation" and exiled to the Soviet Union where he was arrested and shot for counterrevolution in 1941.

Biography
Shijee was born in present-day Bortala, Xinjiang in 1901. He was a partisan fighter in the Outer Mongolian Revolution of 1921 and then became prison director. In 1923 he joined the MPRP working for the party's Central Committee. Shijee was one of several younger, more radicalized party members from rural areas (others included Tsengeltiin Jigjidjav, Ölziin Badrakh, Bat-Ochiryn Eldev-Ochir, Jambyn Lkhümbe, and Peljidiin Genden) recruited by the Soviets to challenge the authority of the MPRP "old guard". Soviets enrolled him in the Communist University of the Toilers of the East in Moscow and then sent him to agitate Uyghur Hui students and organize supplies of arms and revolutionaries to the Xinjiang region as part of Soviet plans to establish a puppet government there. It was during this period that Shijee first met Badrakh and the two discussed the possibility of creating an autonomous republic of non-Khalkh Mongol regions of Dörvöd (present-day Uvs Province), Tannu Uriankhai, and  Xinjiang.

Shijee returned to Mongolia in 1928 and rose within the government through a rapid series of promotions: he was first elected secretary of the Central Council of the Mongolian Trade Unions, then appointed head of Internal Security Directorate from 1928 to 1929, and then made chairman of the board of the State Bank from 1929 to 1930. He was one of several "new leftists" promoted into party leadership positions during the Eighth Party Congress in 1930,  when he was elected member of presidium (or politburo) of the MPRP and one of three secretaries of the party Central Committee (a position he would hold until June 30, 1932). From March 13, 1931 to June 30, 1932, he was the first secretary of the Central Committee.

Recognized as one of the party's most extreme leftists, Shijee actively pushed Soviet tailored policies that aggressively forced herders onto collective farms, suppressed private trade, and seized property of both the nobility and the Buddhist church. As a result, one third of Mongolian livestock was decimated,  over 800 properties belonging to the nobility and the Buddhist church were confiscated, and approximately 700 heads of mostly noble households were executed. When violent uprisings spread across western Mongolia in 1932 in reaction to the harsh policies, Moscow ordered a curtailment of the unpopular initiatives and pinned the blame for the excesses of what became known as the "Leftist Deviation" on Shijee and other hard-line leftists within the party leadership, including Ölziin Badrakh, and Prime Minister Tsengeltiin Jigjidjav. All were officially expelled from the party in May 1932.

Shijee was exiled to Moscow where in 1937 he was arrested on charges of counterrevolution. Shijee's father, a simple herder in Mongolia, was also arrested.  He was sentenced to death by military collegium of the USSR Supreme Court on July 9, 1941, and shot July 27, 1941.

He was rehabilitated in 1963.

Notes

Mongolian communists
Mongolian People's Party politicians
Communism in Mongolia
Great Purge victims from Mongolia
1901 births
1941 deaths
Mongolian people executed abroad
People from Bortala
Politicians from Xinjiang
People executed by the Soviet Union by firearm
Executed communists